Carlos Albert Llorente (born 10 July 1943) is a Mexican former footballer. He competed in the men's tournament at the 1964 Summer Olympics.

References

External links
 

1943 births
Living people
Mexico international footballers
Olympic footballers of Mexico
Footballers at the 1964 Summer Olympics
Footballers from Mexico City
Association football defenders
Club Necaxa footballers
Footballers at the 1967 Pan American Games
Pan American Games gold medalists for Mexico
Medalists at the 1967 Pan American Games
Pan American Games medalists in football
Mexican footballers